Camaligan, officially the Municipality of Camaligan, is a 4th class municipality in the province of Camarines Sur, Philippines. According to the 2020 census, it has a population of 25,036 people. Camaligan rapidly became an urban town during the 1990s.

Camaligan is part of the Metro Naga Urban Area.

The town is home to the oldest known pre-colonial site in the Bicol region, dating 500 AD to 600 AD, making it an undeclared important archaeological zone.

Etymology

The origin of the town and its name can be traced back to the early settlers of the place. Known as the cortadores, or woodcutters, to the early Spanish colonizers who came to the place in the early 1700s, the settlers cut timbers from nearby mountains located upriver or around San Miguel Bay and made this as their form of living. Out of these timbers, they hewed out canoes or bancas which they stored under small sheds or huts.  Later, when these sheds became abundant in the area, as they were made the permanent dwelling places by these canoe makers, the place was called "Camaligan", which means "a place where many sheds can be found", by combining the root word kamalig (or shed) and the locative suffix -an. The sheds served to shelter the canoe makers and protect their boats from the natural elements. Hence, the name and origin of the town is historically tied to the Bicol River and its early inhabitants.

"Catagbacan" was the oldest known name of Camaligan. Moreover, according to D. Adolfo Puya y Ruiz, in his “Camarines Sur – Descripcion General De Està Provincia En Luzon” (Manila: 1887), Camaligan was called "Kinamaligan" before.

History

Pre-colonial era
The town of Camaligan is a known archeological site. In 2016 to 2017, hundreds of artifacts, including shells, jar fragments, tools, other deposits, pig bones, deer bones, stingray cartilage, shark cartilage, and at least fifteen (15) pre-colonial human remains, were found in the area, which marked a revolutionary phase in Bicol archaeology. The shells and tools found in the town was dated back 1,500 years ago or approximately 500 to 600 AD. The site contained no trace of Chinese, Southeast Asian, or South Asian trade links, making Camaligan a pure pre-colonial Bicolano site.

Spanish era
The settlers of the religious visita of Nueva Caceres, which was then under its ecclesiastical jurisdiction, arrived in the town by the 17th century. The pre-colonial cemetery and community center were transformed by the Spanish into the town's current church compound to diminish native belief systems and instill Catholicism. During this time,  Camaligan had five barrios in its jurisdiction, namely Marupit, Doncal (now Dugcal), Sua, San Roque and Tarosanan. Each barrio has a small wooden chapel.

On 5 June 1795, a petition to the Spanish religious authorities was sent by the natives and signed by the supposedly officials of the place, to request for a resident curate.  The officials’ names were Andre Casa, Diego, Lobao, Simeon de la Cruz, Manuel del Espiritu Santo, Fernando Valenzuela, Agustin del Espiritu Santo, Marcos David, Domingo Flores, Pedro Negre, Bartolome Rodriguez and Valentine de los Santos. Fray Rafael de Benavente was appointed as the first parish priest.

American era

In 1902, the municipality was officially established through an act of the Philippine legislature.  It also named Pedro Bustamante as the first municipal mayor.  This event of the creation of the Municipality of Camaligan was brought about by a historical fact when the town was eventually separated from being as an annex of Nueva Caceres (now Naga City).

Geography

Barangays

Camaligan is politically subdivided into 13 barangays.

Climate

Camaligan has a significant amount of rainfall during the year. This is true even for the driest month. According to the Köppen climate classification system, Camaligan has a tropical rainforest climate. The average annual temperature is 27.1 °C in Camaligan. About 2527 mm of precipitation falls annually.

Demographics

Economy 

Bicol River serves as a natural source of irrigation and fertilization to the town where agriculture is still considered as a major industry.

Out of the 468 hectares total land area, 175 hectares are devoted to rice production, all of which are irrigated and fertilized by the river through its occasional flooding.

Government
Camaligan is being headed by a mayor who is being elected by its residents.

The current mayor of the town is Diano Ibardaloza, Jr. Last May 2022 Election, he has been elected for his first term as the Municipal Mayor.

Since 1902, thirty-one (31) mayors already headed the town.

Culture

The people of Camaligan derived their socio-cultural identity as river people from the existence of the river. Bicol River is an important resource for irrigation and fertilization of the land where agriculture and fishing is still considered as a major industry.  The place's festivals, songs and dances found their roots and inspiration from the river.  Hence, the river ecology has bred its own distinct community.

Festivals
Religious and cultural festivals are being held in the town.
 Kamalig Festival - Camaligan's main festival, which happens from June 5 to 13, in celebration of the town's founding anniversary and the feast of St. Anthony of Padua, the town's patron saint.
 Ati-atihan Festival - a street dance competition and parade inspired by the festival in Aklan of the same name, in honor of Santo Niño, the town's second patron.
 Kamaligang Pasko Festival - a celebration of Christmas wherein the town, most especially its people center and its river park, is being decorated, and a man-sized christmas village is being set-up outside the municipal hall.

Tourism

St. Anthony of Padua Parish Church is one of the oldest churches in the province of Camarines Sur. The church is one of the favorite spots for Visita Iglesia in the province.

Santo Domingo Chapel is an old chapel which was a former burial ground during pre-colonial times. It is a central archeological site where a lot of burial jars, porcelains and skeleton bones were found during the diggings.

Sira, or fish, is a small wharf painted with festive colors that is constructed on the riverside of barangay San Francisco. This also serves as a dock for banca passengers.

After the initial launching of Camaligan River Park on 1 June 2014, its tourism industry began to be more active. Its continuous improvements attracted many visitors, mostly coming from the City of Naga, to come and enjoy walking along the riverside.

M/B Camaligan is a motorboat which docks beside Camaligan River Park. Also known as Camaligan River Cruise, it is also a floating restaurant which crosses the Bicol River. Launched last 6 February 2019, it is the newest attraction which promotes the river culture of the town.

Archaeology

Camaligan is Bicol region's oldest known pre-colonial site, filled with numerous stone tools, jar fragments, shell middens, pig and deer bones, shark and ray cartilages, and other artifacts and biofacts. The site also homes to fifteen human skeletons of pre-colonial Ibalons. The site is so rare and vital as it does not contain any evidences of trade contact with China, Southeast Asian neighbors or South Asia, making it one of the very few pre-colonial sites in the Philippines with distinct Filipino artifacts and biofacts unaffected by outside trade. Both the University of the Philippines and University of California, Los Angeles have been pushing for the town's declaration as an "Important Archaeological Site." Scholars have also been pushing for the site's nomination in the UNESCO World Heritage List.

In a documentary made by GMA News TV, it was found that the artifacts and biofacts were not limited to the town proper. In fact, during a road-widening project conducted in September 2017 by the national government, hundreds of human bone fragments, animal bones, burial and ceremonial jar fragments, and stone tools were found after digging only the edges of the road. The documentary also found many Camaligueños to own artifacts they have found in their own land. Due to these findings, the town's reputation as a vital pre-colonial Ibalon archaeological site was solidified.

Education
Camaligan has one high school, six elementary schools and thirteen preschools. At present, there is no existing tertiary school in the town.

High school
 Camaligan National High School - the only high school in the town. The junior high school campus is located in barangay San Jose-San Pablo, while the senior high school is located in barangay Dugcal.

Elementary schools
 Camaligan Central School - the oldest school and the primary elementary school of the town.
 Sua Elementary School
 Dugcal Elementary School
 San Roque Elementary School
 Marupit Elementary School
 Tarosanan-San Francisco Elementary School

Preschools
 Hansel & Gretel Day Care Center
 Petite L'e' Tudiant Learning Centre
 Dugcal Day Care Center
 Gogon Day Care Center
 Marupit Day Care Center
 San Francisco Day Care Center
 San Juan Day Care Center
 San Lucas Day Care Center
 San Mateo Day Care Center
 San Roque Day Care Center
 Sua Day Care Center
 Tampac Day Care Center
 Tarosanan Day Care Center

Notable personalities

 Joyce Nocomura - crowned as Miss Philippines Water 2007.

References

External links

 [ Philippine Standard Geographic Code]
Philippine Census Information
Official Site of the Province of Camarines Sur

Municipalities of Camarines Sur
Metro Naga